Jean-Baptiste Lacoste (died 1821) was a lawyer with Mauriac in department of the Cantal, before French revolution.

Under the Revolution 
In 1789, he was Justice of the Peace. In 1792, he was elected to the Convention for the department of the Cantal.

In 1792–3, he was Commissioner to the Army of the Moselle, under Pichegru.

After 9 Thermidor, however, he helped release Général Etienne de la Bruyère, imprisoned in Strasbourg for alleged treason, obtaining from the Committee of Public Safety, on 22 Thermidor (10 August 1794) a decree thus conceived: 

The young representative announced to him this good news by letter: 

In Alsace, he created a revolutionary commission which was chaired by Euloge Schneider. That was worth a long captivity for him, which finishes thanks to the amnesty of the 3 brumaire, year IV, (25 October 1795).

Under the Consulate and the First Empire 
He was named prefect.

Under the Restoration 
Louis XVIII of France exiled him, but rather quickly allowed him to return in France.

References

Sources 
 French revolution of Jules Michelet and handwritten Memorial of the family of La Bruyère

Year of birth missing
1821 deaths
French politicians